de Lundin (Londres, Lundie, Lundy, Lundyn, Londonius and Londoniis) is the surname of an old Norman noble family. The family descends from Thomas Londoniis c.1005, whose son William de Londres was one of the 12 Knights of Glamorgan. After the Norman conquest they settled in Fife. The family has a long military history, and was one of the most successful families in Scotland for several hundred years before losing power. The agnatic line of the family ended sometime in the 12th century, and survived only via an heiress, a certain Lady de Lundin who married Robert, the bastard son of William the Lion. Robert adopted the family name and it is from this couple that the cognatic line descends. Due to this, in 1679 King Charles II granted the family and all of its descendants the right to bear the Scottish royal coat of arms

French origin
The family descends from Thomas Londoniis c.1005.

Wales
William de Londres, one of the Twelve Knights of Glamorgan and son of Thomas Londoniis, obtained lands in Glamorgan, the Lordship and castle of Ogmore and the castle and Manor of Dunraven when he accompanied Robert Fitzhamon in the Norman conquest of Glamorgan. William's son, Maurice de Londres, went on to expand the family's holdings. He became Marcher Lord of Kidwelly, and defeated Gwenllian ferch Gruffydd in 1136 at the Battle of Kidwelly Castle, who he beheaded after the battle.

Scotland
Thomas de Londoniis settled in Scotland in the 12th century. King Malcolm IV of Scotland granted to Malcolm his son the barony of Lundie, Forfar and to his other son Philip, the barony of Lundin, Fife. Their descendant Alan, adopted the surname Durward (Doorward) after the position of warden of the king's door that he held.

References

Medieval English families
Scottish surnames
History of Wales
Anglo-Norman families